Leon L. Campbell (July 1, 1927September 2, 2002) was an American football fullback who played five seasons in the National Football League (NFL) for the Baltimore Colts, the Chicago Bears, and the Pittsburgh Steelers. Campbell played college football at the University of Arkansas before being a 2nd round selection (15th overall pick) in the 1950 NFL Draft.

References

External links
 

1927 births
2002 deaths
People from Bauxite, Arkansas
Players of American football from Arkansas
American football fullbacks
Arkansas Razorbacks football players
Baltimore Colts (1947–1950) players
Chicago Bears players
Pittsburgh Steelers players